Ted van de Pavert (born 6 January 1992) is a Dutch professional footballer who plays as a centre-back for Eerste Divisie club Roda JC.

Club career

De Graafschap
Van de Pavert progressed through De Graafschap's youth academy. He made his professional debut for the club on 18 December 2010, replacing Leon Broekhof in the 89th minute of a 4–0 Eredivisie loss to SC Heerenveen. 

He scored his first goal in professional football on 7 August 2011, opening the score by heading in a corner-kick in an eventual 4–1 home loss to Ajax. He suffered relegation to the Eerste Divisie with De Graafschap in the 2011–12 season, losing out in the second round of play-offs to FC Den Bosch. 

In three subsequent Eerste Divisie season, De Graafschap would then reach the play-offs for promotion with Van de Pavert; eventually winning promotion back to the Eredivisie in 2015 after a win over FC Volendam. With De Graafschap he finished the 2015–16 season seventeenth place, which also meant participation in the 2016 editions of the play-offs, the fifth season in a row for the club.

Van de Pavert made 157 total appearances for De Graafschap, in which he scored eight goals.

PEC Zwolle
On 27 May 2016, Van de Pavert signed a three-year contract with PEC Zwolle, who had finished eighth in the Eredivisie the previous season. He made his competitive debut for the club on the first matchday of the 2016–17 Eredivisie season, starting at centre-back alongside Dirk Marcellis in a 1–1 away draw against NEC. 

Van de Pavert played one season for PEC in which he made 26 total appearances, scoring two goals.

NEC
After the one season in Zwolle, Van de Pavert was sent on a one-season loan to NEC competing in the second-tier Eerste Divisie. The club also negotiated an option to buy. He appeared in the starting lineup on the first matchday of the season against Almere City. On 25 October 2017, Van de Pavert scored his first goal for NEC in a game against Jong PSV which ended in a 3–3 draw.

Return to De Graafschap
Van de Pavert returned to his first club De Graafschap on 30 June 2018, signing a two-year contract.

Roda JC
On 3 August 2022, Van de Pavert joined Roda JC on a one-year contract. He made his debut for the club two days later, replacing Phil Sieben in the 90th minute of a 2–0 away win over Dordrecht on the first matchday of the 2022–23 season. On 30 September he made his first start for Roda, also scoring his first goal for the club in a 2–1 league loss to Almere City.

International career
Van de Pavert gained his first and only international cap for the Netherlands U20s on 6 February 2013, coming on as a half-time substitute for Stefano Denswil in a 3–0 loss to Republic of Ireland U21 at Tallaght Stadium.

Career statistics

References

External links
 
 Ted van de Pavert on Voetbal International 

1992 births
Living people
Dutch footballers
Netherlands youth international footballers
De Graafschap players
PEC Zwolle players
NEC Nijmegen players
Roda JC Kerkrade players
Eredivisie players
Eerste Divisie players
People from Doetinchem
Association football defenders
Footballers from Gelderland